Nya tider is a Swedish soap opera which was broadcast on TV4. It began after Skilda världar became a one-episode-a-week show. The show premiered in 1999 and got good ratings the first season, but they soon dropped. Broadcast was moved to just being an episode a week on Sundays, but this did not increase viewership; Nya tider never enjoyed the same viewership as Skilda världar. It was cancelled in 2006.

The show's cast included Rebecca Ferguson as Anna Gripenhielm (1999–2001).

In 2000 TV4 ran the reality show Jakten på Billie Jo to pick an actress to play the new villain, Billie Jo. American Alexandra Sapot won the role.

References

1990s Swedish television series
1999 Swedish television series debuts
2000s Swedish television series
2006 Swedish television series endings
Swedish television soap operas
Swedish-language television shows
TV4 (Sweden) original programming